The Free County of Burgundy or Franche-Comté was a medieval county (from 982 to 1678) of the Holy Roman Empire, predecessor to the modern region of Franche-Comté. The name  derives from the title of its count, in German  'free count', denoting imperial immediacy. It should not be confused with the more westerly Duchy of Burgundy, a fiefdom of France since 843.

History

The area once formed part of the Kingdom of the Burgundians, which had been annexed by the Franks in 534 and incorporated into the Kingdom of the Franks. The Empire was partitioned in 843 by the Treaty of Verdun, with the area west of the Saône river being allotted to West Francia as the French Duchy of Burgundy, while the southern and eastern parts of the former Burgundian kingdom fell to Middle Francia under Emperor Lothair I. This Middle Frankish part became the two independent entities of southern Lower Burgundy in 879 and northern Upper Burgundy under King Rudolph I in 888. The County of Burgundy formed the western part of the latter.

In 933, with the collapse of the Carolingian Empire, Lower and Upper Burgundy were re-united under King Rudolph II as the Kingdom of Arles (Arelat), which itself collapsed amid feudal anarchy with the extinction of his line in 1032. The Arelat then passed to the Holy Roman Empire when it was inherited by Emperor Conrad II of the Salian dynasty, while the Duchy of Burgundy was re-installed by a cadet branch of the French Capetian dynasty.

In 982, Otto-William, son of Adalbert of Lombardy, Count at Mâcon in the Duchy of Burgundy, received the County of Burgundy from his marriage with Ermentrude of Roucy. He thereby became the progenitor of the comital Anscarid dynasty, a collateral branch of the Bosonid dukes of Burgundy, descending from Hugh the Black, a 10th-century brother of Duke Rudolph, and from Hugh's brother-in-law Gilbert. In 1002, Otto-William also claimed the Duchy of Burgundy upon the death of his stepfather Duke Henry I. However, the duchy was seized as a reverted fief by King Robert II of France two years later, and he was only able to maintain rule over the Arelat county with his residence at Dole. The development of commercial routes across the Jura and the development of salt mines assured the prosperity of the county, and its towns preserved their freedom and neutrality in feudal conflicts.

Guy of Burgundy, brother of Renaud II, later became pope and negotiated the Concordat of Worms with Emperor Henry V. In the 12th century, Imperial protection allowed for the development of Besançon, but in 1127, after the assassination of William III, his cousin Renaud III shook off the Imperial yoke. Burgundy was from then on called , the "free county".

Emperor Frederick Barbarossa re-established imperial influence, took prisoner the brother of Count William IV, and extended his influence by marrying William IV's niece and heir, Beatrice I, the daughter of Renaud III, when William IV died. Upon Emperor Frederick's death in 1190, his younger son Otto I received the county of Burgundy and assumed the rare (unique?) title of an archcount. He was succeeded by his daughter, Beatrice II, and her husband Otto I, Duke of Merania; they were in turn followed by their son, Otto III, Count of Burgundy, and their daughter, Adelaide.

The Counts Palatine for many years had to share power with the greater feudal families of the county, notably with the family of Chalon, which was descended from Stephen III, count of Auxonne, grandson of William IV and Beatrice of Thiern, the heir of the county of Chalon. The authority of the counts was re-established only by the marriage of Hugh of Chalon with Adelaide, the sister and heiress. However, this did not prevent a younger son, John of Chalon-Arlay, from taking control of the vassal states. 

Otto IV, son of Hugh and Adelaide, was the last of the feudal counts of Burgundy. He married first the daughter of the Count of Bar, but the marriage was childless. His second marriage was to the grandniece of King Louis IX of France, Countess Mahaut of Artois. This marriage brought the county under French influence. The daughters of Otto IV and Mahaut, Joan II and Blanche, married respectively Philip V and Charles IV of France, sons of King Philip IV. Jeanne became Queen of France after having been involved in the Tour de Nesle Affair. In that same affair, Blanche was found guilty of adultery and was imprisoned for the rest of her life.

After quarreling with his barons, and after a new revolt against the French carried out by John of Chalon-Arlay, Otto IV ceded the county to his daughter as a dowry and designated the King of France as administrator of the dowry in 1295. By marrying their daughter and heir Joan, Duke Odo IV of Burgundy reunited the duchy and the county under his rule, followed by his grandson Duke Philip I. The personal union was again broken after Philip had died without heirs in 1361, when the Duchy of Burgundy was seized as a reverted fief by King John II of France, while the Imperial county was inherited by Philip's great aunt Margaret I, a granddaughter of Count Otto IV. In 1382, she bequeathed her estates to her son Count Louis II of Flanders.

Louis II died in 1384 leaving no male heirs, and the County of Burgundy formed part of the immense dowry of his daughter Margaret, which in 1405 was inherited by her son, the Burgundian duke John the Fearless. The county and the duchy were again ruled in personal union by his descendants from the House of Valois-Burgundy until the death of Duke Charles the Bold at the 1477 Battle of Nancy. His cousin King Louis XI of France immediately occupied the county, but  Archduke Maximilian I of Habsburg took opposition to this action, as he was the husband of Charles' daughter Mary the Rich. Though defeated at the 1479 Battle of Guinegate, the French retained the county until Louis' successor King Charles VIII of France, wishing to be free of conflicts over the county in order to intervene in Naples, again ceded it to Emperor Maximilian and his son Philip I of Castile by the 1493 Treaty of Senlis.

With the Netherlands, the County of Burgundy was held by Habsburg Spain until it was finally incorporated into France by the Treaty of Nijmegen in 1678.

See also
 List of counts of Burgundy
 Kingdom of Burgundy
 Kings of Burgundy
 Duchy of Burgundy
 Duke of Burgundy
 Dukes of Burgundy family tree
 Free Imperial City of Besançon

External links
 The History Files: Frankish Kingdom of Burgundy

 
Burgundian Circle
History of Franche-Comté
Burgundy, County
867 establishments
States and territories disestablished in 1678
1400s in the Burgundian Netherlands
980s establishments in the Holy Roman Empire
1678 disestablishments in the Holy Roman Empire
982 establishments